Omri Nave (born November 26, 1988) is a former Israeli footballer who plays for Ihud Bnei Kafr Qara.

Honours
Liga Alef (South) (1):
2009-10

References

External links
 
 
 

1988 births
Living people
Israeli Jews
Israeli footballers
Maccabi Netanya F.C. players
Sektzia Ness Ziona F.C. players
Hapoel Herzliya F.C. players
Hakoah Maccabi Amidar Ramat Gan F.C. players
Hapoel Katamon Jerusalem F.C. players
Maccabi Ironi Amishav Petah Tikva F.C. players
Maccabi Kiryat Malakhi F.C. players
Beitar Kfar Saba F.C. players
F.C. Kafr Qasim players
Maccabi Jaffa F.C. players
Ihud Bnei Kafr Qara F.C. players
Liga Leumit players
Footballers from Ramat Gan
Association football central defenders